The Southeastern Conference first sponsored football in 1933. This is an era-list of its annual standings from 1933 to 1991.

Standings

References

Southeastern Conference
Standings